Henry Russell Nicoll (1883–1948) was a Scottish cricketer.

Biography 
Born in Angus on 27 February 1883 and educated at the Morgan Academy, Nicoll played once for the Scotland national cricket team, a first-class match against Ireland in July 1914. He took 7/64 in the second innings of the match.

In April 1919, he played for the Federated Malay States against the Straits Settlements in Singapore alongside fellow Scottish international William Cockburn. He died in Dundee on 25 September 1948.

References

1883 births
1948 deaths
Sportspeople from Angus, Scotland
Federated Malay States cricketers
Scottish cricketers
Cricketers from Dundee